Für Euch, die Ihr liebt is a double-CD studio album released by electro-medieval/darkwave band Helium Vola. It was released in 2009 by Chrom Records.

Track listing

CD1 

 "A Voi Che Amate" – 1:48
 "Saber D'Amor" – 6:58
 "Oh Pescador" – 4:14
 "Blow, Northerne Wynd" – 5:32
 "Mes Longs Cheveux" – 1:49
 "L'Alba" – 5:28
 "In So Hoher Swebender Wunne" – 6:23
 "Friendly Fire" – 4:17
 "Hor Che 'L Ciel" – 4:42
 "Escoutatz" – 5:15
 "Maienzeit" – 6:11
 "Ecce Gratum" – 6:16

CD2 
 "Preghiera" – 2:06
 "Nummus" – 4:39
 "Mayab" – 4:25
 "Mord" – 3:14
 "Canta Me" – 4:35
 "Manifesto" – 5:03
 "Quan Lo Pet" – 2:21
 "Ray Gun" – 5:14
 "Come Talore" – 3:31
 "Darkness, Darkness" – 5:14
 "Moorsoldaten" – 6:59
 "Nuestrasz Vidas" – 8:01

Credits 
 Artwork - Tim Becker
 Cello - Jost Hecker
 Composed by Ernst Horn (tracks: 1-1, to 1-4, 1-6 to 1-12, 2-1 to 2-9, 2-12)
 Keyboards, producer - Ernst Horn
 Mastered by Christoph Stickel
 Viola - Olga Hübner
 Violin, guitar - Ralf Hübner
 Vocals - Sabine Lutzenberger

External links 
 

2009 albums
Helium Vola albums